The Hexie Mountains are a desert mountain range located in Joshua Tree National Park, in southern California.

Geography
The range is located in the higher northern Mojave Desert area of the park. They are north of the Cottonwood Mountains, and south of the Pinto Mountains. The Eagle Mountains lie to the east of the Hexie Mountains.

Natural history
Numerous washes drain the Hexie Mountains, including Porcupine Wash and Fried Liver Wash.  These host a mixture of low and high desert animals and plants.  A herd of desert bighorn sheep also live there.

History
There were attempts to mine and mill gold at many sites, including Ruby Lee Mill, and none were successful.  Native petroglyphs can also be found in the Hexie Mountains.

References

Mountain ranges of the Mojave Desert
Mountain ranges of Riverside County, California
Mountain ranges of Southern California
Joshua Tree National Park